Ji Shengpan (born 8 November 1999) is a Chinese footballer currently playing as a forward or right winger for Zhejiang Pro.

Club career
Ji Shengpan would play for the Shandong Taishan youth team before going out on loan to third tier football club Zibo Cuju on 13 July 2018. He would  continue to be loaned out to Zibo and was part of the team that gained promotion to the second tier at the end of the 2020 China League Two season. On 12 April 2021 he would be loaned out to second tier club Beijing BSU for the 2021 China League One season and while he went on to establish himself as vital member of the team as well as personally scoring seven league goals he was allowed to leave his parent club and permanently joined Zibo on 29 April 2022. Back at Zibo, he would personally have his most productive season where he personally scored 13 goals throughout the season, which saw top tier club Zhejiang Pro go on to sign him on 18 February 2023.

Career statistics
.

References

External links 

1999 births
Living people
People from Yongjia County
Footballers from Zhejiang
Chinese footballers
Association football forwards
China League Two players
China League One players
Shandong Taishan F.C. players
Zibo Cuju F.C. players
Beijing Sport University F.C. players